rnn is an open-source machine learning framework that implements recurrent neural network architectures, such as LSTM and GRU, natively in the R programming language, that has been downloaded over 100,000 times (from the RStudio servers alone).

The rnn package is distributed through the Comprehensive R Archive Network under the open-source GPL v3 license.

Workflow 

The below example from the rnn documentation show how to train a recurrent neural network to solve the problem of bit-by-bit binary addition.

> # install the rnn package, including the dependency sigmoid
> install.packages('rnn')

> # load the rnn package
> library(rnn)

> # create input data 
> X1 = sample(0:127, 10000, replace=TRUE)
> X2 = sample(0:127, 10000, replace=TRUE)

> # create output data
> Y <- X1 + X2

> # convert from decimal to binary notation 
> X1 <- int2bin(X1, length=8)
> X2 <- int2bin(X2, length=8)
> Y  <- int2bin(Y,  length=8)

> # move input data into single tensor
> X <- array( c(X1,X2), dim=c(dim(X1),2) )

> # train the model
> model <- trainr(Y=Y,
+                 X=X,
+                 learningrate   =  1,
+                 hidden_dim     = 16  )
Trained epoch: 1 - Learning rate: 1
Epoch error: 0.839787019539748

sigmoid 
The sigmoid functions and derivatives used in the package were originally included in the package, from version 0.8.0 onwards, these were released in a separate R package sigmoid, with the intention to enable more general use. The sigmoid package is a dependency of the rnn package and therefore automatically installed with it.

Reception 
With the release of version 0.3.0 in April 2016 the use in production and research environments became more widespread. The package was reviewed several months later on the R blog The Beginner Programmer as "R provides a simple and very user friendly package named rnn for working with recurrent neural networks.", which further increased usage.

The book Neural Networks in R by Balaji Venkateswaran and Giuseppe Ciaburro uses rnn to demonstrate recurrent neural networks to R users. It is also used in the r-exercises.com course "Neural network exercises".

The RStudio CRAN mirror download logs
 show that the package is downloaded on average about 2,000 per month from those servers
, with a total of over 100,000 downloads since the first release, according to RDocumentation.org, this puts the package in the 15th percentile of most popular R packages
.

References

External links
Repository on GitHub
rnn package on CRAN

Deep learning software
Free statistical software
Free science software
Open-source artificial intelligence
R scientific libraries
Free R (programming language) software
R (programming language)